The Battle of Harnaulgarh was fought between the Durrani Empire and the Sikh Misls of Dal Khalsa in 1762.

Battle
The Sikhs assembled on May 1762 and plundered the baggage of the Mughal governor of Sirhind, Zain Khan Sirhindi. The Sikh forces then marched and fought a severe battle with the Durranis at Harnaulgarh, a place 30 miles from Sirhind. The Sikhs secured a decisive victory at Harnaulgarh by driving away the Afghans and the defeated governor of Sirhind, Zain Khan Sirhindi, was forced to pay tribute of Rs. 50,000 to the Sikhs as a penalty for his loss.

References 

Harnaulgarh
Harnaulgarh
Harnaulgarh
1762 in India
Fatehgarh Sahib district